Clathrodrillia garciai is a species of sea snail, a marine gastropod mollusc in the family Drilliidae.

Description
The length of the shell varies between 10 mm and 31 mm.

Distribution
This marine species occurs in the Caribbean Sea off the Campeche Bank, French Guiana and Suriname, in the Gulf of Mexico off Louisiana, Alabama and Mississippi; and off Brasil.

References

 Fallon P.J. (2016). Taxonomic review of tropical western Atlantic shallow water Drilliidae (Mollusca: Gastropoda: Conoidea) including descriptions of 100 new species. Zootaxa. 4090(1): 1–363

External links
 

garciai
Gastropods described in 2016